Extended Versions is a live album by the Swedish rock band Europe. It was released on 27 March 2007.

Track listing
 "The Final Countdown" (Joey Tempest) – 5:12
 "Danger on the Track" (Joey Tempest) – 4:00
 "Carrie" (Joey Tempest / Mic Michaeli) – 4:40
 "Time Has Come" (Joey Tempest) – 4:17
 "Rock the Night" (Joey Tempest) – 5:27
"I'll Cry for You" [acoustic] (Joey Tempest / Nick Graham) – 3:58
 "On the Loose" (Joey Tempest) – 3:08
 "Cherokee"  (Joey Tempest) – 5:11
"On Broken Wings" (Joey Tempest) – 7:20
"Let the Good Times Rock" (Joey Tempest) – 5:15

Personnel
Joey Tempest – lead vocals, acoustic guitars
John Norum – lead & rhythm guitars, backing vocals (track 4)
Kee Marcello - lead & rhythm guitars, backing vocals (on all tracks except 4)
John Levén – bass guitar
Mic Michaeli – keyboards, backing vocals
Ian Haugland – drums, backing vocals
Jeffrey James - Compilation producer
Richard King - Compilation engineer
Denis O'Regan - Cover photo

Europe (band) compilation albums
2007 live albums